Chrysoula Zacharopoulou (born 7 May 1976) is a Greek-French gynaecologist and politician who has served as Minister of State for Development, Francophonie and International Partnerships in the government of Prime Minister Élisabeth Borne since 20 May 2022. A member of La République En Marche! (LREM), she previously was a Member of the European Parliament (MEP) from 2019 to 2022.

Education and early career
Zacharopoulou was born into a military family. Trained in minimally invasive procedure, she specialized in endometriosis in Italy and, from 2007, in France. Before entering politics, she worked at the Bégin Military Teaching Hospital in Saint-Mandé, near Paris.

In 2015, Zacharopoulou joined forces with French actress Julie Gayet on establishing Info-Endométriose, a non-profit raising awareness for endometriosis.

Political career
Zacharopoulou became a Member of the European Parliament in the 2019 elections. From 2019 to 2022, she was a vice-chair of the Committee on Development and the parliament's rapporteur on the Africa-EU partnership. In 2022, she briefly joined the Special Committee on the COVID-19 pandemic.

In addition to her committee assignments, Zacharopoulou was part of the Parliament's delegation to the ACP–EU Joint Parliamentary Assembly. She was also a member of the MEPs Against Cancer group; European Parliament Intergroup on Cancer; the European Parliament Intergroup on LGBT Rights; the European Parliament Intergroup on Disability; and of the European Parliament Intergroup on the Welfare and Conservation of Animals.

Amid the COVID-19 pandemic, Zacharopoulou returned to practicing for several days a week at the Bégin Military Teaching Hospital in March 2020.

Since April 2021, Zacharopoulou has been co-chairing the Shareholders Council of COVAX, alongside Fernando Ruiz Gómez. In this capacity, she was part of the delegation accompanying President Emmanuel Macron on his state visit to Rwanda and South Africa in May 2021. In November 2021, the European Union's Foreign Affairs Council followed a proposal of Josep Borrell and appointed Zacharopoulou as its focal person to strengthen coordination among EU member states and accelerate efforts on sharing COVID-19 vaccine doses, especially in Africa. In December, she accompanied President of the European Council Charles Michel and France's Minister for Europe and Foreign Affairs Jean-Yves Le Drian on official trips to Senegal.

Political positions
In 2020, Zacharopoulou publicly criticized Vice-President of the European Commission Dubravka Šuica for having taken "disturbing positions" in the past by voting against motions on sexual and reproductive health and rights.

Rape allegations
In June 2022, it was reported that French prosecutors were investigating accusations that Zacharopoulou raped two of her former gynaecological patients. The former patients filed lawsuits in May and June 2022 alleging that Zacharopoulou carried out vaginal and rectal examinations without their consent, in January and June 2016.

References

1976 births
Living people
MEPs for France 2019–2024
21st-century women MEPs for France
People from Sparta, Peloponnese
French people of Greek descent
French gynaecologists
La République En Marche! MEPs
Women government ministers of France
Members of the Borne government